Żebry may refer to the following places:
Żebry, Grajewo County in Podlaskie Voivodeship (north-east Poland)
Żebry, Kolno County in Podlaskie Voivodeship (north-east Poland)
Żebry, Łomża County in Podlaskie Voivodeship (north-east Poland)